Punk Sucks is a California punk rock compilation album, released  by Southern California-based Liberation Records in 1995.

Track listing
Pennywise - "Slowdown"
No Use for a Name - "Soulmate"
Ten Foot Pole - "Racer X"
Sublime - "All You Need"
Home Grown - "Face in the Crowd" 
Voodoo Glow Skulls - "Descendent's Song"
White Kaps - "Germs"
88 Fingers Louie - "Too Many"
Neighbors - "Sometimes"
H.F.L. - "Old School Pride"
Everready - "I Hate You"
Bollweevils - "New Dreams"
Unwritten Law - "C.P.K." 
Good Riddance - "Mother Superior"
Blink-182 - "M+M's"
Strung Out - "Support Your Troops"
Naked Aggression - "Right Now"
Jughead's Revenge - "49/61" 
Funeral Oration - "Damn You"
Overlap - "Song #9" 
The Bouncing Souls - "The Ballad Of Johnny X"
Boris the Sprinkler - "All My Time" 
Glue Gun - "Skate The Haight"
Quincy Punx - "Cereal Killer"
Fed Up! - "Can't Figure It"
Straight Faced - "Omit"
F.Y.P - "2000 A.D." 
Fighting Cause - "Bummers"
Supernovice - "Out On The Grass"
The Living End - "Deadbeat"

Punk revival albums
1995 compilation albums